Oric Jamieson (born 11 August 1960, in Kilwinning) is a former British sprint canoeist and slalom canoeist who competed in the 1980s and the 1990s. Competing in three Summer Olympics, he earned his best finish of seventh in the C-2 500 m event at Los Angeles in 1984.

He also won two medals in the C-2 team event at the ICF Canoe Slalom World Championships with a gold in 1981 and a bronze in 1983.

References

1960 births
Scottish male canoeists
Canoeists at the 1984 Summer Olympics
Canoeists at the 1988 Summer Olympics
Canoeists at the 1992 Summer Olympics
Living people
Olympic canoeists of Great Britain
People from Kilwinning
British male canoeists
Medalists at the ICF Canoe Slalom World Championships